Mamarchev Peak is the peak with tween heights both rising to  in the north part of Sullivan Heights in central Sentinel Range in Ellsworth Mountains, Antarctica, and surmounting Pulpudeva Glacier to the west and Ellen Glacier to the north.

The peak is named after Georgi Mamarchev (1786–1846), leader of the Bulgarian liberation movement, in connection with the settlement of Mamarchevo in Southern Bulgaria.

Location
US mapping in 1961, updated in 1988.

See also
 Mountains in Antarctica

Maps
 Vinson Massif.  Scale 1:250 000 topographic map.  Reston, Virginia: US Geological Survey, 1988.
 Antarctic Digital Database (ADD). Scale 1:250000 topographic map of Antarctica. Scientific Committee on Antarctic Research (SCAR). Since 1993, regularly updated.

Notes

References
 Mamarchev Peak. SCAR Composite Antarctic Gazetteer
 Bulgarian Antarctic Gazetteer. Antarctic Place-names Commission (in Bulgarian)
 Basic data (in English)

External links
 Mamarchev Peak. Copernix satellite image

Bulgaria and the Antarctic
Ellsworth Mountains
Mountains of Ellsworth Land